The Number Twelve Looks Like You is an EP by the group The Number Twelve Looks Like You. Released approximately three weeks before the album Mongrel, at only selected Hot Topic Stores, this EP was intended to tide over fans waiting for the upcoming full-length release, which gives it the other name of "Mongrel Sampler."

The EP features two demo versions of songs originally featured on An Inch of Gold in an Inch of Time, one song to be featured on the upcoming release Mongrel and an intro track.

Track listing
 "Car Commercial" - 0:32
 "Sleeping with the Fishes, See?" - 3:41
 "Clarissa Explains Cuntainment (Demo)" - 2:27
 "Like a Cat (Demo)" - 3:26

Personnel
The Number Twelve Looks Like You
Jesse Korman - vocals
Justin Pedrick - vocals
Alexis Pareja -  guitars
Jamie Mcilroy - guitars
Chris Russell - bass guitar
Jon Karel - drums, other percussion

Production
Produced by Casey Bates

2007 EPs
The Number Twelve Looks Like You albums